Oblpotrebsoyuz Building or Sibkraisoyuz Building is a building in Tsentralny District of Novosibirsk, Russia. It is located between Krasny Avenue, Ordzhonikidze and Trudovaya streets. The building was built in 1926 by architect Andrey Kryachkov.

The building is a part of the architectural ensemble of Lenin Square.

History
From the late 1950s until 1997, part of the building was occupied by the bookshop ("The Central House of Book", Tsentralny Dom Knigi) with a department of foreign literature called "Druzhba" ("Friendship").

Gallery

See also
 Business House
 Gosbank Building

References

Tsentralny City District, Novosibirsk
Buildings and structures in Novosibirsk
Buildings and structures completed in 1926
Cultural heritage monuments of regional significance in Novosibirsk Oblast